Viktor Fekiač (born 14 February 1993) is a Slovak professional ice hockey centre playing for HK MŠK Indian Žiar nad Hronom of the Slovenská hokejová liga.

Career 
Fekiač previously played for HKM Zvolen, making his professional debut with the team during the 2012–13 Tipsport Liga playoffs. He split his time between Zvolen and HC 07 Detva before becoming a permanent member of Detva on May 22, 2018.

Personal life 
Fekiač is the older brother of Frederik Fekiač and the two has often played alongside each other during their careers.

Career statistics

Regular season and playoffs

References

External links

1993 births
Living people
HC 07 Detva players
Sportspeople from Zvolen
Slovak ice hockey centres
HKM Zvolen players
HC 21 Prešov players
HK MŠK Indian Žiar nad Hronom players